is a passenger railway station located in the city of Himeji, Hyōgo Prefecture, Japan, operated by the private Sanyo Electric Railway.

Lines

Station layout
The station consists of two unnumbered elevated side platforms with the station building underneath. The station is unattended.

Platforms

Adjacent stations

|-
!colspan=5|Sanyo Electric Railway

History
Nishi-Shikama Station opened on 15 October 1940.

Passenger statistics
In fiscal 2018, the station was used by an average of 1285 passengers daily (boarding passengers only).

Surrounding area
Tsudatenma Shrine
 Eiga Castle Honmaru Monument

See also
List of railway stations in Japan

References

External links

 Official website (Sanyo Electric Railway) 

Railway stations in Japan opened in 1940
Railway stations in Himeji